is a Japanese rugby union player who plays as a Lock. Hasegawa played his first game for the Wild Knights on 26 August 2016 against Yamaha Júbilo.

International
Japan head coach Jamie Joseph has named Ryota Hasegawa in a 52-man training squad ahead of British and Irish Lions test.

References

1993 births
Living people
Japanese rugby union players
Rugby union locks
Saitama Wild Knights players
Sunwolves players
Rugby union flankers